Madhavaram is a neighbourhood of Chennai, Tamil Nadu, India. Located in the northern part of Chennai, it is also a taluk in Chennai District and a zone in Greater Chennai Corporation. It is located in between Perambur and Kodungaiyur. As of 2011, the neighbourhood had a population of 119,105. The Chennai district was expanded on 16 August 2018 by transferring Madhavaram taluk from Tiruvallur district to Chennai district.

History
The Madhavaram taluk was formed on 1 July 2009 when the large Ambattur taluk was split into two. The latter was considered the largest land area in Chennai, which consisted of five fircas (towns). The new Madhavaram taluk consists of two fircas (Madhavaram and Red Hills) and 36 villages. The old name of Madhavaram is Mathavapuram, as seen in a stone in front of the Ganesh Mandir in Rajaji Street.

Geography

It has an average elevation of 13 metres (42 feet).

Demographics

According to 2011 census, Madhavaram had a population of 119,105 with a sex-ratio of 989 females for every 1,000 males, much above the national average of 929. A total of 13,030 were under the age of six, constituting 6,703 males and 6,327 females. Scheduled Castes and Scheduled Tribes accounted for 12.4% and 0.28% of the population respectively. The average literacy of the town was 80.61%, compared to the national average of 72.99%. The town had a total of 29,792 households. There were a total of 43,385 workers, comprising 148 cultivators, 233 main agricultural labourers, 765 in house hold industries, 36,871 other workers, 5,368 marginal workers, 89 marginal cultivators, 65 marginal agricultural labourers, 283 marginal workers in household industries and 4,931 other marginal workers.
During 2001–2011, Madhavaram registered a population growth of 56% with a 2011 population of 118,525.

Religion
As per the religious census of 2011, Madhavaram (M) had 82.73% Hindus, 4.08% Muslims, 12.48% Christians, 0.05% Sikhs, 0.04% Buddhists, 0.16% Jains, 0.46% following other religions and 0.01% following no religion or did not indicate any religious preference.

There is a Shivan temple in Madhavaram which is believed to be 1,300 years old. There is also a Vishnu Temple and some smaller temples in the locality.
St. Sebastian's Church, the local parish, is in Madhavaram. Other churches are on MTH Road, KKR Garden, Gangaiamman Koil street. There are few mosques in KKR Garden, Milk Colony and Vinayagapuram.

Educational Institutions
 St. Ann's Matric Higher Secondary School
 Bosco Academy Matric Higher Secondary School
 Don Bosco Matric Higher Secondary School 
 St. Thomas Matriculation Higher Secondary School
 St. Joseph Matric Higher Secondary School
 Ramakrishna Matric Higher Secondary School
 Shree Sakthi Matriculation School
 Velammal New Gen - School

CBSE affiliated Schools
 Olive Tree Global Education Campus
 Thiruthangal Nadar Vidhyalaya School
 Greenfield Chennai International School
 Velammal New Gen School
 Everwin Vidhyaashram School
 KC Toshniwal Vivekananda Vidyalaya School
 Sri Chaitanya Techno School

State Board affiliated Schools
 St.Thomas Matriculation Higher Secondary School
 Bosco Academy Matriculation Higher Secondary School
 Government Higher Secondary School
 Padma Prakash Matriculation Higher Secondary School 
 Ramakrishna Matriculation Higher Secondary School
 St. Anne's Girls' School
 St. Ann's Matriculation Higher Secondary School
 St. Joseph's Matriculation Higher Secondary School
 St. Thomas' School 
 Sri Shakthi Matriculation School

Colleges
Jayagovind Harigopal Agarwal Agarsen College
Tamil Nadu Government Cooperative Staff Training College.

Universities
 Tamil Nadu Veterinary and Animal Sciences University
 Tamil Nadu Dr. J. Jayalalithaa Fisheries University, Madhavaram Campus
 Tamil Nadu Agricultural University, Madhavaram Campus

Social organizations

West Cancer Trust advocates cancer awareness by counselling and screening the locals, both the rural people and the students. "LIGHT" NGO is situated in Manjampakkam neighbourhood, working for children, women, health and education. It is also home to a large number of the Anglo Indian community.

Administration and politics

Madhavaram is a newly formed state legislative constituency with more than 200,000 (2 lakh) voters. It consists of areas like Madhavaram, Mathur MMDA, Manali, Milk Colony, Puzhal, Red Hills, Sholavaram and Vadakarai. Madhavaram belongs to Chennai's corporation zone lll. Presently, Mr.S.Sudarsanam is the Member of Legislative Assembly.

Transportation
Madhavaram Inter-city Bus Terminus, one of the satellite termini of Chennai, is located in the neighbourhood, chiefly handling buses to Andhra Pradesh and Telangana, including cities such as Chittoor, Tirupati, Nellore, Vijayawada, Kurnool, Puttaparthi, Visakhapatnam, Bhadrachalam, and Hyderabad.

Metropolitan Transport Corporation (MTC) runs passenger buses to Madhavaram from other major parts of Chennai. A bus terminus serves the residents. Share Autos play an important role in transportation.

Truck Terminal
It is located near the junction of 100 Feet Road and the GNT Road, with easy access to Chennai city, port and railways. The terminal has been functioning since 1992. The objective of the project is to provide modern and functionally efficient truck terminals for the benefit of the city.

Botanical garden

A botanical garden development broke ground on a 28-acre site in September 2010. The project was expected to complete in February 2013, at a cost of ₹57.3 million. The facility has almost 400 species of plants and also a herbal garden along with a nursery. A glasshouse, fountains, a birds' sanctuary, an auditorium and a children's play area are other facilities of the garden.

The Horticulture Training Centre in Madhavaram was also to be upgraded to Horticulture Management Institute, at a cost of ₹39 million.

Skyscrapers
The tallest building in the region is the 23-storey M-One Towers, residential apartments with 234 units, built on a plot of 2.1 acres.

Hospitals
 St. Anthony's Hospital
 KM Hospital
 Murari Hospital
 Jeevodaya Hospice for Cancer Patients
 Govt. Hospital
 Srikumaran Health Center, Retteri

References

External links 
 Madhavaram Municipality

Cities and towns in Chennai district
Neighbourhoods in Chennai